was a town located in Kitasaitama District, Saitama Prefecture, Japan.

As of January 1, 2008, the town had an estimated population of 14,855 and a density of 607.07 persons per km². The total area was 24.47 km².

On March 23, 2010, Ōtone, along with the towns of Kisai, Kitakawabe (all from Kitasaitama District), was merged into the expanded city of Kazo. Kitasaitama District was dissolved as a result of this merger.

References 

Dissolved municipalities of Saitama Prefecture
Kazo, Saitama